The German Hunting and Fishing Museum is a museum exhibiting objects connected with the history of hunting and fishing in Germany or other territories which nowadays belong to it.

Location
Located in the pedestrian zone of the city center of Munich, Bavaria, it is a rare institution worldwide. The building was a church (the Augustinian Church) which was part of a large Augustinian monastery between the 13th century and 1803.

History

Around 1900, with hunting being at its (last) height of popularity, people asked for a hunting museum. In 1934, the Imperial Hunting Museum (Reichsjagdmuseum) was finally established.

During World War II, most of the objects were saved in Schloßgut Ast near Landshut, Bavaria. All other objects were lost because of looting. After the war, there was a big discussion about the further structure of the Reichsjagdmuseum. In 1958, the year of the 800th anniversary of the founding of the city, the decision in favour of the Augustinian Church was taken. The German Hunting Museum (Deutsches Jagdmuseum) was re-opened on St. Hubert's Day, 3 November 1966.

In 1982, fishing was added as a field of interest, and the museum was renamed the German Hunting and Fishing Museum (Deutsches Jagd- und Fischereimuseum).

Collection
The museum exhibits about 500 wild stuffed animals, including an Irish elk, a cave bear and several endemic freshwater fish. The collection includes fishing tackle, hunting weapons (especially 15th- to 19th-century), and large sledges presenting a time span of several centuries.

Several so-called Wolpertinger creatures, Bavarian fictional animals, are on display.

References

External links

  www.jagd-fischerei-museum.de: Deutsches Jagd- und Fischereimuseum official page

Museums in Munich
1934 establishments in Germany
Museums established in 1934
Hunting in Germany
Hunting museums
Natural history museums in Germany
Fishing in Germany
Fishing museums